Riad Chehbour (born 28 July 1985) is an Algerian handball player for MC Alger.

He participated at the at 4 World Championships (2009, 2013, 2015, 2021).

He also won 5 five medals at African Championships: gold in 2014, silver in 2012, bronze in 2008, 2010 and 2020.

References

1985 births
Living people
Sportspeople from Algiers
Algerian male handball players
21st-century Algerian people
Mediterranean Games competitors for Algeria
Competitors at the 2009 Mediterranean Games
20th-century Algerian people